The International Union of Hotel, Restaurant and Bar Workers (IUHR) was a global union federation bringing together trade unions representing hospitality workers.

History
In the late 19th- and early 20th-century, the Union of German Restaurant Workers was by far the strongest in Europe, and it established branches in many other countries, in cities to which German workers had migrated.  In 1908, it organised a conference in Berlin which established the international union, with headquarters in the city.

The secretariat ceased operations during World War I, but was re-established in 1920 at a conference in Amsterdam.  Its headquarters were in Amsterdam for four years, before returning to Berlin, then moved to The Hague around the end of the decade.  After World War II, it was again re-established, on this occasion based in Stockholm.

In its early years, the IUHR was one of the smaller international trade secretariats.  By 1925, it had 13 affiliates, with a total of 57,077 members, but it grew rapidly after World War II, and by 1960 its 15 affiliates had a total of 550,000 members.  In 1961, it merged into the International Union of Food, Drink and Tobacco Workers' Associations, which renamed itself as the "International Union of Food, Agricultural, Hotel, Restaurant, Tobacco and Allied Workers' Associations".

Affiliates
In 1960, the following unions were affiliated to the IUHR:

General Secretaries
1908: Albert Baumeister
1912: Hugo Poetzsch
1920: J. G. van Heusden
1924: Rudolf Ströhlinger
1933: P. F. Loncke
1937: Henry Sjöh

References

Trade unions established in 1908
Trade unions disestablished in 1961
Global union federations
Hospitality industry trade unions